Salatyn Aziz qizi Asgarova (also spelled Salatyn Askerova; ; 16 December 1961 – 9 January 1991) is a National Hero of Azerbaijan. Azerbaijani journalist killed in the First Nagorno-Karabakh War.

Life 

Salatyn Aziz qizi Asgarova was born on 16 December 1961 in Baku, Azerbaijan. After completing secondary school, she entered Azerbaijan Oil and Chemistry Institute. Nevertheless, her enormous interest in literature brought her into journalism. She started her journalistic career at “Baku” newspaper, and then began working as a special correspondent for Molodezh Azerbaijana  (The Youth of Azerbaijan). Before the beginning of the First Nagorno-Karabakh War, Salatyn was writing about contemporary issues of society. However, after the war broke out, Salatyn frequently visited the front line and provided press coverage from hot spots. Her family and colleagues tried to persuade her not to go to the front line jeopardizing her life. In such cases, she would usually say: “If nobody goes, then who will?”

First Nagorno-Karabakh War 

On 9 January 1991, the 29-year-old journalist was on her way to Shusha to prepare a story for the newspaper. At the 6th kilometer of the Lachin - Shusha highway, next to the village of Boyuk Galadarasi, the vehicle in which she was traveling was shot upon by Armenian militants firing from at almost point-blank range with machine guns and sniper rifles. The investigators counted 113 bullet holes in the vehicle. As a result of the attack, Salatyn Asgarova died instantly. Three military officers (Lieutenant-Colonel O. Larionov, Major I. Ivanov, and Sergeant I. Goyek) of the Soviet Army accompanying her were killed as well. The attackers – Arno Mkrtchian, Hrachik Petrossian, A. Mongasagian and Garik Arustamian – were identified and arrested. They were later released and handed over to the Armenian authorities.

Legacy
A Baku street and a vessel in the Caspian Sea carry her name.

A monument in her memory was erected at Tafakkur University in Baku.

She has conferred the National Hero title posthumously. Salatyn Asgarova was buried in the Martyrs' Lane in Baku.

References

External links 

1961 births
1991 deaths
1991 murders in Asia
Journalists from Baku
Women war correspondents
Journalists killed while covering the Nagorno-Karabakh War
National Heroes of Azerbaijan
People murdered in Azerbaijan
Deaths by firearm in Azerbaijan
Azerbaijani murder victims
Azerbaijani people of the Nagorno-Karabakh War
20th-century women writers
20th-century Azerbaijani writers
Female murder victims
20th-century journalists